The 1996 Nevada Wolf Pack football team represented the University of Nevada, Reno during the 1996 NCAA Division I-A football season. Nevada competed as a member of the Big West Conference (BWC). The Wolf Pack were led by first–year head coach Jeff Tisdel and played their home games at Mackay Stadium.

Schedule

Personnel

References

Nevada
Nevada Wolf Pack football seasons
Big West Conference football champion seasons
Las Vegas Bowl champion seasons
NNevada Wolf Pack football